Harry Thomas Smith (October 31, 1874 – February 17, 1933), was an English professional baseball player and manager. He played in Major League Baseball as a catcher from 1901 to 1910.

Baseball career
Smith was born in October 31, 1874 in Yorkshire, England. He played as a back-up catcher for Pittsburgh Pirates (1902–07, 178 games) and Boston Doves (1907–11, 154 games), after starting at Philadelphia Athletics for 11 games. Smith had planned to retire as a player and become a scout in 1909 but, when manager Frank Bowerman resigned in mid-July, the Doves named him as a player-manager for the remainder of the season. He was replaced as manager by Fred Lake for the 1910 season but, remained on as a catcher. He played in his final major league game in 1910 at the age of 35.

Career statistics
In a ten-year major league career, Smith played in 343 games, accumulating 214 hits in 1,004 at bats for a .213 career batting average along with 2 home runs, 89 runs batted in and an on-base percentage of .262. He had a .967 career fielding percentage as a catcher during his career. He was a strong defensive catcher with a 47.32 career caught stealing percentage that ranks 50th among all major league catchers.

Minor league managerial career
After his playing career went on to manage in the Minor Leagues for several seasons.

See also
List of Major League Baseball player–managers

References

External links

1874 births
1933 deaths
Major League Baseball players from the United Kingdom
Major League Baseball players from England
English baseball players
Sportspeople from Yorkshire
Philadelphia Athletics players
Pittsburgh Pirates players
Boston Doves players
Boston Doves managers
Major League Baseball catchers
Minor league baseball managers
Canton Deubers players
Buffalo Bisons (minor league) players
Wilkes-Barre Coal Barons players
Milwaukee Brewers (minor league) players
Danville Red Sox players
Newark Indians players
Dallas Giants players
Galveston Pirates players
Major League Baseball player-managers